Friday the 13th, also known as Friday the Thirteenth, is a lost 1916 silent film drama directed by Émile Chautard and starring Robert Warwick. It was produced and distributed by World Film Corporation. It was based on the 1907 novel Friday the Thirteenth by Thomas W. Lawson.

Cast
Robert Warwick - Robert Brownley
Clarence Harvey - Peter Brownley
Charles Brandt - Judge Lee Sands
Gerda Holmes - Beulah Sands
Montagu Love - Count Varneloff
Leonore Harris - Simone

See also
La Bohème (1916 film)

References

External links
 Friday the 13th at IMDb.com

silent hollywood ; lantern slide

1916 films
American silent feature films
Lost American films
American black-and-white films
World Film Company films
Films directed by Emile Chautard
Silent American drama films
1916 drama films
1916 lost films
Lost drama films
1910s American films
1910s English-language films